Cameron University is a public university in Lawton, Oklahoma. It offers more than 50 degrees through both undergraduate and graduate programs. The degree programs emphasize the liberal arts, science and technology, and graduate and professional studies. It was founded in 1908, soon after Oklahoma was admitted as a state, as one of six agricultural high schools in the largely rural region.

History
The Oklahoma Legislature created six agricultural high schools in each judicial district in 1908, a year after statehood. Lawton was chosen over Anadarko in April 1909 to receive a high school; the town had already set aside a portion of land to develop a higher educational institution. The University Improvement Association, under the auspices of the Lawton Chamber of Commerce, organized the effort to acquire  of land two miles (three kilometers) west of the town. Its original goal was to secure a private Baptist college. Arrangements with the Baptists fell through in the summer of 1908. The Catholic Church approached the Association with an offer to found an all-male institution on the site. This plan was rejected by the town leaders, who were predominantly Protestant.

What was known as the Cameron State School of Agriculture was named for Rev. E. D. Cameron, a Baptist minister and Oklahoma's first State Superintendent of Schools. The first classes were held on Statehood Day, November 16, 1909, in the basement of a bank building, while a new campus building was being constructed.

In 1927 Cameron added junior college-level classes to the school's offerings, when local higher education needs exceeded what was available in southwest Oklahoma. With this expansion, the institution was renamed as Cameron State Agricultural College. By 1941, the high school preparatory classes were dropped. Cameron was classified solely as a junior college that year, when the Oklahoma State System of Higher Education was formed and joined the group of institutions governed by the Board of Regents of Oklahoma A&M Colleges.

Based on additional development of programs and curriculum, in 1966 the legislation passed a bill authorizing the Oklahoma State Regents for Higher Education to allow the college to award Baccalaureate degrees. The institution's name was shortened to Cameron College in 1971 and, with more program expansion, changed to Cameron University in 1974. As the 1970s continued, Cameron demonstrated its dedication to expanded academic offerings through the construction of a fine arts facility designed to serve students in theatre, music, broadcasting, and speech communication.

Dr. Donald J. Owen served as Cameron's president from 1969 to 1980. A Cameron graduate, Owen worked to build academic programs and develop relationships with the Lawton community, as well as the Oklahoma State University system, under which CU fell during his tenure. Cameron's sports teams, particularly football and basketball, excelled during that time. A new President's residence was constructed on Gore Boulevard, west of the campus.

In 1988, State Regents expanded Cameron's functions to include graduate offerings at the master's degree level. This was the first change granted to an Oklahoma institution since Cameron was given the authority to offer bachelor's degrees more than 20 years earlier. In the 1990s, Cameron University came under the Board of Regents of the University of Oklahoma.

Don Davis was President of Cameron University from 1980 to 2002. His father, Clarence L. Davis, was President of Cameron from 1957 to 1960. As a child, Davis lived in the President's house on campus with his parents and sister. As a former legislator from Lawton, Davis was able to secure funding for Cameron that supported it in developing as the premier institute for higher education in southwestern Oklahoma. Also during Davis' tenure, a classical radio station, KCCU 89.3, was founded. Numerous renowned scholars, including Richard Leakey and Cornel West, have spoken at Cameron's annual Academic Festival.

In May 2004, Cameron took over the Duncan Higher Education Center in Duncan, Oklahoma. It was renamed as Cameron University - Duncan.

Presidents
Since its founding in 1908, Cameron University has had 17 presidents.
 J. A. Liner, 1908–1912
 Ralph K. Robertson, 1912–1913
 E. M. Frost, 1913
 Robert P. Short, 1913–1914
 A. C. Farley, 1914–1920
 A. E. Wickizer, 1920–1923
 John G. March, 1923–1927
 John Coffey, 1927–1931
 Charles M. Conwill, 1931–1946
 Clarence H. Breedlove, 1946–1947
 C. Vernon Howell, 1947–1957
 Clarence L. Davis, 1957–1960
 Richard B. Burch, 1960–1969
 Don J. Owen, 1969–1980
 Don C. Davis, 1980–2002
 Cindy Ross, 2002–2013
 John M. McArthur, 2013–present

Accreditation
Cameron University is accredited by the Higher Learning Commission. The Bachelor of Accounting, Bachelor of Business Administration, and Master of Business Administration degrees offered by the School of Graduate and Professional Studies are accredited by the Accreditation Council for Business Schools and Programs.

Campus life
Most courses are offered during weekdays and evenings. Cameron uses television, the internet, and a statewide fiber-optics network to deliver classes around the world. Students may participate in independent study, cooperative education, pre-professional studies, teacher certification, and the Army ROTC program. In addition, Cameron offers an honors program, early admission, advanced standing, and college-level examination programs. Some 58% of entering students require remedial work, as their median ACT scores are at the ninth percentile. 

A wide range of organizations and interest groups are located on campus, including departmental, minority, professional, political, and religious organizations, and various honorary and recognition societies. Students can also become involved in student government, choral groups, a jazz ensemble, theater, or Greek life.

Athletics

Cameron's athletic teams, known as the Aggies, are a member of Division II of the National Collegiate Athletics Association (NCAA), primarily competing in the Lone Star Conference. Sports offered are men's and women's basketball, baseball, volleyball, softball, spirit team, men's and women's golf, men's and women's tennis, men's and women's cross country, men's and women's track and field.

Notable alumni
 Billy Paultz – Played 15 seasons of professional basketball in the ABA and the NBA. Made 3 ABA All-Star teams, leading the league in blocked shots in 1975–76. Won an ABA championship with the New York Nets in 1973-74
 Hillbilly Jim - Professional wrestler known as "Hillbilly" Jim Morris
 William C. Bilo – United States Army Brigadier General who served as deputy director of the Army National Guard
 John Brandes – National Football League special teams player
 Doug Brown – US Army General and former Commanding General, US Special Operations Command
 Mark Cotney – Tampa Bay Buccaneers defensive back
 Jason Christiansen – Major League Baseball pitcher
 Avery Johnson – Basketball player in NBA and former head coach of the University of Alabama men's basketball team. He formerly coached the Brooklyn Nets and Dallas Mavericks teams of the NBA
 Gary Jones – politician, appointed as Oklahoma State Auditor and Inspector
 Nate Miller – American football player
 Gary M. Rose - Medal of Honor recipient for gallantry during the Vietnam War
 T.W. Shannon – politician and first African-American Speaker of the Oklahoma House of Representatives
 Ray Gene Smith – NFL player
 Charles Washington – NFL and CFL player
 Adrian Wiggins – Former Fresno State women's basketball coach, and former women's basketball program head coach at the University of Mississippi
 Thomas Toth – Canadian runner

References

External links
 
 Cameron Athletics website

 
Lawton, Oklahoma
Public universities and colleges in Oklahoma
OK Cooperative Alliance
Educational institutions established in 1908
Education in Comanche County, Oklahoma
Buildings and structures in Comanche County, Oklahoma
1908 establishments in Oklahoma